The Admiralty Jurisdiction Act 1391 (15 Ric 2 c 3) was an Act of the Parliament of England.

The words from the beginning of the Chapter to "his Lieutenant in anywise" were repealed by section 2 of, and Part I of the Schedule to, the Civil Procedure Acts Repeal Act 1879.

The whole Chapter, so far as unrepealed, was repealed by section 10(2) of, and Part I of Schedule 3 to, the Criminal Law Act 1967.

References
Halsbury's Statutes,

Acts of the Parliament of England
1390s in law
1391 in England